The 2017 Weber State Wildcats volleyball team will  represent Weber State University in the 2017 NCAA Division I women's volleyball season. The Wildcats are led by third year head coach Jeremiah Larsen and play their home games at Swenson Gym. The Wildcats are members of the Big Sky.

Weber State comes off a season where they finished 5–11 in conference, 14–13 overall, good for fifth place in the South Division and ninth overall in the conference. Coming into 2017 the Wildcats were picked to finish fifth in the South, eighth overall, in the pre-season Big Sky poll.

Season highlights
Season highlights will be filled in as the season progresses.

Roster

Schedule

 *-Indicates Conference Opponent
 y-Indicates NCAA Playoffs
 Times listed are Mountain Time Zone.

Announcers for televised games
All home games will be on the Pluto TV Ch. 235. Select road games will also be televised or streamed.

Arizona State: John Engelbert
CSUN: Ryan Osborn
Pepperdine: Al Epstein
UNLV: Wyatt Tomchek & Elli Woinowsky
Utah State: Kylee Young
Utah Valley: Kylee Young
BYU: Spencer Linton & Amy Gant
Sacramento State: No commentary
Portland State: Teri Mariani
Southern Utah: Kylee Young
Northern Arizona: Kylee Young
Montana State: Kylee Young
Montana: Kylee Young
Idaho: 
Idaho State: 
Northern Colorado: 
North Dakota:
Eastern Washington: Kylee Young
Idaho State: Kylee Young
Northern Arizona: 
Southern Utah:
Portland State: Kylee Young
Sacramento State: Kylee Young

References

2017 team
2017 in sports in Utah
Weber State